The California Winter League is an instructional showcase league for free agent baseball players who are looking to earn a professional contract before spring training begins. The league was created by Andrew Starke in 2010, and takes place in Palm Springs, California, at the Palm Springs Stadium complex which is a former spring training facility of the Los Angeles Angels.

Instructors
Each season, the California Winter League hires current MLB pro scouts and professional independent league managers to act as instructors during the CWL season. These instructors manage games, work to develop CWL players, and sign CWL players during their time at the CWL. Every year, roughly 40% of CWL players receive a professional contract offer. The league has a partnership agreement with the Frontier League for scouting and player development.

Purpose
The purpose of the California Winter League is to provide coaching and an avenue for players to get noticed by scouts with the ultimate goal of signing a professional contract. Past players have signed with any of various Independent baseball leagues and MLB organizations.

CWL teams
The league plays most games at Palm Springs Stadium and some at  Palm Springs High School baseball field.

References

External links
 California Winter League website

Professional sports leagues in the United States
Winter baseball leagues
Sports in Riverside County, California
Palm Springs, California
Independent baseball leagues in the United States
Baseball leagues in California
Sports leagues established in 2009
2009 establishments in California